Holy Cross College (HCC) is a Catholic higher-secondary school for girls, located at Tejgaon in Dhaka, Bangladesh. It serves students of class 11 and class 12. It was founded in 1950 by the Sisters of the Holy Cross.

Notable alumni

 Shirin Sharmin Chaudhury, speaker of Bangladesh National Parliament
 Dipu Moni, education minister of Bangladesh
 Rubana Huq, Vice-Chancellor of Asian University for Women
 Subarna Mustafa, actress and politician
 Meerjady Sabrina Flora, Bangladeshi epidemiologist
 Justice Salma Masud Chowdhury, justice of the Supreme Court of Bangladesh
 Justice Naima Haider, justice of the Supreme Court of Bangladesh
 Justice Farah Mahbub, justice of Supreme Court of Bangladesh
 Nihad Kabir, lawyer, president of FBCCI
 Sonia Bashir Kabir, Bangladeshi businessperson
 Saida Muna Tasneem, Diplomat, High Commissioner for Bangladesh to the United Kingdom, Ambassador to Ireland, Liberia

See also
Holy Cross Girls' High School (Dhaka)
Notre Dame College, Dhaka
St. Joseph Higher Secondary School

References

Christianity in Dhaka
Educational institutions established in 1951
Colleges in Dhaka District
High schools in Bangladesh
Schools in Dhaka District
Catholic schools in Bangladesh
Christian schools in Bangladesh
Holy Cross College, Dhaka
1951 establishments in East Pakistan

External links

Official Website